Carla Federica Nespolo (4 March 1943 – 4 October 2020) was an Italian politician, President of National Association of Italian Partisans from 2017 until her death.

Biography 
Nespolo was born in Novara on 4 March 1943. After she graduated in philosophy, Nespolo joined the Italian Communist Party, becoming the first communist woman from Piedmont to be elected to the Italian Parliament.

She spent six years, from 1970 to 1976, in the provincial council of Alessandria, before getting elected to the Chamber of Deputies. She kept her seat in the Palazzo Montecitorio until 1983 when she was elected to the Senate. During her term in Parliament, Nespolo was rapporteur of the law for the reform of upper secondary school, member of the RAI Supervisory Committee and rapporteur for several proposals for the law on women's rights. She served on the special commission for the law of equality between men and women in work.

From 2011 to 2017, Nespolo was Vice President of the National Association of Italian Partisans under the guidance of Carlo Smuraglia.

In November 2017, Nespolo was elected President of the National Association of Italian Partisans, becoming the first woman to be elected president and the first who didn't take part in the Italian resistance movement, since she was too young.

Nespolo died on 4 October 2020, at the age of 77, after a long illness.

References

External links 
Files about her parliamentary activities (in Italian): VII, VIII, IX, X legislature.

1943 births
2020 deaths
People from Novara
Deputies of Legislature VII of Italy
Deputies of Legislature VIII of Italy
Italian Communist Party politicians
Senators of Legislature IX of Italy
Senators of Legislature X of Italy
Politicians of Piedmont
Italian feminists
Italian socialist feminists
20th-century Italian women politicians
21st-century Italian women politicians
Women members of the Chamber of Deputies (Italy)
Women members of the Senate of the Republic (Italy)